Mauro Antonio Caballero López (born 3 May 1972) is a Paraguayan former football striker and current coach of 3 de Febrero in the División Intermedia.

Career
Caballero started playing for Club 24 de Junio of Altos and then moved to the youth divisions of Olimpia Asunción in 1991. In 1992, he made his debut on the senior team for Olimpia, where he would win several national and international championships. Caballero also played for other clubs such as Tigres de la UANL, Cerro Porteño, Club Libertad, Club Jorge Wilstermann, Nacional and Estudiantes de Mérida. His best years as a striker where in 1998 and 2001, when he was the Paraguayan 1st Division topscorer.

International career
Caballero made his international debut for the Paraguay national football team on 9 October 1996 in a World Cup Qualifier against Chile (2-1 win). He obtained a total number of 14 international caps, scoring two goals for the national side. Caballero also played for the Paraguay national football team during the 1992 Olympic Games and the 1998 World Cup qualifiers.

Coaching career
In January 2022, Caballero was assigned as the coach of División Intermedia team 3 de Febrero, after having coached Olimpia Asunción's under-19 team.

Honours

Club
 Olimpia Asunción
 Paraguayan Primera División: 1993, 1995, 1997, and 1998
 Torneo República: 1992
 Copa Libertadores: 2002
 Recopa Sudamericana: 2003
 Cerro Porteño
 Paraguayan Primera División: 2001

Individual
 Olimpia Asunción
 Top scorer Paraguayan Primera División 1998: 21 goals
 Cerro Porteño / Libertad
 Top scorer Paraguayan Primera División 2001: 21 goals

References

External links
 
 

1972 births
Living people
People from Fernando de la Mora, Paraguay
Paraguayan footballers
Club Olimpia footballers
Tigres UANL footballers
Club Libertad footballers
Cerro Porteño players
C.D. Jorge Wilstermann players
Club Nacional footballers
Expatriate footballers in Mexico
Expatriate footballers in Bolivia
Expatriate footballers in Venezuela
Paraguay international footballers
Footballers at the 1992 Summer Olympics
Olympic footballers of Paraguay
1999 Copa América players
Estudiantes de Mérida players
Club Olimpia managers
Association football forwards
Paraguayan football managers